The  is an electric multiple unit (EMU) commuter train type operated by the private railway operator Sagami Railway (Sotetsu) in Japan.

History
The trains are based on JR East's E231 series design, and were built to replace ageing 5000, 2100, and 6000 series trains. The 10000 series were constructed by Tokyu Car Corporation in Yokohama and JR East's Niitsu factory. A total of 70 cars were built, formed as sets.

Formations
, the fleet consists of three ten-car sets and five eight-car sets, formed as follows.

10-car sets

8-car sets

Key
 <: Current collection device (single-arm pantograph)
 VVVF: Variable frequency drive
 SIV: Static inverter
 CP: Compressor
 Bold/italic number: Fleet number

Liveries

Interior

Refurbishment

References

Electric multiple units of Japan
10000 series
Train-related introductions in 2002
Tokyu Car multiple units
1500 V DC multiple units of Japan